The Agadir air disaster was a chartered Boeing 707 passenger flight on Sunday, August 3, 1975, that crashed into a mountain on approach to Agadir Inezgane Airport, Morocco. All 188 passengers and crew on board were killed. It is the deadliest aviation disaster involving a Boeing 707, as well as the deadliest in Morocco.

Flight

The 707, owned by Jordanian World Airways, a subsidiary of Alia, was chartered by the national airline of Morocco, Royal Air Maroc, to fly 181 Moroccan workers and their families from France home for the holidays. It was the early hours of morning when the aircraft approached Agadir. There was heavy fog in the area and the aircraft was flying in from the northeast over the Atlas Mountains. Part of the wing separated. The aircraft lost control and crashed into a ravine.

Rescue teams found wreckage over a wide area.

The cause of the crash was determined to be pilot error in not ensuring positive course guidance before beginning descent. The aircraft had not followed the usual north-south corridor generally used for flights to Agadir.

References

Airliner accidents and incidents involving controlled flight into terrain
Airliner accidents and incidents caused by pilot error
Aviation accidents and incidents in 1975
Accidents and incidents involving the Boeing 707
Aviation accidents and incidents in Morocco
Royal Air Maroc accidents and incidents
Royal Jordanian accidents and incidents
1975 in Morocco
August 1975 events in Africa
1975 disasters in Morocco